The TerraMar Project was self-described as an environmental nonprofit organization. It was founded in 2012 in the United States by Ghislaine Maxwell. A sister organisation in the United Kingdom was incorporated in 2013. TerraMar (U.S.) announced its closure on 12 July 2019. This was shortly after New York federal prosecutors arrested Maxwell's close associate Jeffrey Epstein. Epstein was a financier who was being charged with sex trafficking crimes for a second time. TerraMar (UK) was officially dissolved on 3 December 2019.

History

The TerraMar Project, United States 
The TerraMar Project was founded on 26 September 2012 at the Blue Ocean Film Festival and Conservation Conference in Monterey, California, and focused on the 64% of the ocean that lies outside any single country's jurisdiction. Their mission was to create a "global ocean community" based around the idea of shared ownership of the global commons, also known as the high seas or international waters.

In 2014, on behalf of the TerraMar Project, Maxwell gave a lecture at the University of Texas at Dallas and later that year, a TED talk, about the importance of ocean conservation. Maxwell also spoke at the United Nations as the founder of the TerraMar Project.  She accompanied Stuart Beck, a 2013 TerraMar board member, to two United Nations meetings to discuss the project. Maxwell presented at the Arctic Circle Assembly in Reykjavík, Iceland in 2013. 

Scott Borgerson, listed on TerraMar's board of directors for 2013, appeared with Maxwell at the Arctic Circle conference.  In June 2014, Maxwell and Borgerson spoke at an event in Washington, DC sponsored by the Council on Foreign Relations, titled “Governing the Ocean Commons: Growing Challenges, New Approaches”. TerraMar's commitment to advancing the Sustainable Development Goals (SDG) was showcased by the Clinton Global Initiative.

Tax documents for U.S. organization the TerraMar Project consistently list Ghislaine Maxwell as the organization's President. The TerraMar Project's address was in New York City for 990 tax filings from 2012 through 2015, with later filings showing a Woburn, Massachusetts address for 2016 and 2017. The New York Times reported that TerraMar gave out no money in grants between 2012 and 2017 and that it was described as having unusually high accounting and legal fees for an organization of its size.  

Questions were also raised about what TerraMar entailed beyond the high profile appearance by Maxwell at the United Nations and on the TED stage. In 2017, an executive at a maritime firm made multiple requests for project funding to TerraMar's development director Brian Yuratsis that were ultimately denied despite Yuratsis professing interest in having TerraMar sponsor the project. The maritime executive who made the requests stated that “My impression was that TerraMar as a whole was pretty hollow”, and that “It seemed like Brian was the entire organization.”

On the organization's IRS annual return, the organization reported that it owed $560,650 to Ghislane Maxwell, it owed $1,341 of credit card debt, and it had $10,252 of cash, as of 31 December 2018. During 2018, the organization had spent $5,365 for professional fees, $9,380 for website development, $11,157 for advertising, and $270 of bank fees, but it spent nothing toward program services.

Epstein was charged with new sex trafficking crimes on 6 July 2019. Epstein was a close associate of Maxwell. The TerraMar Project announced its closure six days later, on 12 July 2019, via Twitter and a statement on its website.

TerraMar (UK) 
TerraMar (UK) was a separate private limited company in the United Kingdom. It was incorporated in August 2013 in England and Wales, with the directors being Maxwell, Lucy Clive and Catherine Vaughan-Edwards. The company was run by Maxwell with a similar mission to the TerraMar Project. 

The mission of the charity TerraMar (UK) was published as "the conservation, protection, and improvement of the environment" and, in particular, "the oceans, seas, coastlines and tidal areas", including "the conservation and protection of endangered marine flora and fauna, and the education of the public in the fields of marine conservation, marine ecology and related areas".  

TerraMar (UK) was reported by The Times to have joined the "secretive messenger app service" on 10 August 2019, the same date on which Epstein died in prison. The application for the UK organization to be officially closed was made on 4 September 2019, with the first notice in The London Gazette made on 17 September 2019.

The company was listed as active, with a Salisbury address, until the company was listed as officially dissolved on 3 December 2019.

Founder convicted 
TerraMar's founder, Ghislaine Maxwell, was arrested in July 2020 and charged with six counts related to the sexual abuse and trafficking of minors and lying to investigators. On 29 December 2021, Maxwell was convicted on five of six charges.

Organisation 
The Board of Directors of the TerraMar Project (US) included former Executive Director of the United Nations Office for Partnerships (UNOP) Amir Dossal – who handles $1 billion in the form of a grant from Ted Turner for charities, media executive Steven Haft, and Ariadne Calvo-Platero, daughter of the peer Lord Beaumont of Whitley, Maxwell’s best friend from Oxford.

See also 

Global Commons
International Waters
Sustainable Development Goals

References

External links 
Archive of past versions of The TerraMar Project

Charities based in New York (state)
Organizations based in New York City
Organizations established in 2012
Environmental organizations based in New York (state)
Marine conservation organizations
Fish conservation organizations
Ocean pollution
Organizations disestablished in 2019
Jeffrey Epstein
2012 establishments in the United States
Ghislaine Maxwell